Blades formerly known as Blades of Hades, are an Australian hip hop group from Newcastle. Since forming in the late 1990s they have released four albums, Blades of Hades, This Installment, Shadow Art in 2008, and The Leak in 2013. The group took its name from Greek mythology, where Hades was the Gatekeeper of the Underworld. Their hardcore style lyrics and dark production are reminiscent of many British Hip Hop 'Britcore' acts, such II Tone Committee, Hijack and Killa Instinct. The group have developed a strong following overseas, having performed at many festivals in Europe, including Germany's Mass Hysteria in Hamburg. In 2008, they were the first independent Australian hip hop act to perform at the Glastonbury Festival in the United Kingdom.

History
Newcastle brothers Kid Lyrical and Wizardry met Likewyze onstage, when the duo began rhyming over a performance of a funk band Likewyze was playing guitar in. At the time Likewyze was studying audio at music school and offered to record the duo, along with Scotty B and DJ Skoob, the three time NSW DMC champion. This resulted in their debut album, the self-titled, independently released Blades of Hades.

By 2005, Jane Tyrrell had joined the Sydney hip hop group The Herd full-time. The group counter-acted the line-up change and shortened their name to just 'Blades' in 2006. The same year, they released their second album This Installment, which was distributed by Obese Records. The album featured Newcastle DJ Mark N on cuts and production for the track 'Blast Opposition', which they also released a video clip for. Blades appeared on Oriel Guthre's documentary Skip Hop: Volume One in 2006. They were interviewed and also contributed to the project's soundtrack. Shadow Art was released in 2008, followed by their free to download mix tape Two Thousand And Nine the following year. Another free to download mix tape was released in 2010.

In June 2010, Blades signed to Difrnt Music which acts include Cog and Regular John. Blades are the record label's first hip hop group. Lui from Unda K9 negotiated and got the crew signed whilst she was working as Label Manager for David Edwards (former manager for INXS, Michael Hutchence and the Executive Producer of Rock Star: INXS) who is the MD Difrnt Music. Lui marketed the first single "Where The Fire's At" and assisted briefly in the group's future endeavours to be released from Difrnt to be signed to Warners, with Adam Marshall taking the role as the crew's official manager.

Discography

Albums
Blades of Hades – Independent (2003)
This Installment – Obese Records (2006)
Shadow Art – Steal City Records (2008)
The Leak – WHITEHOUSE (2013)

Singles
Where The Fire's At – Difrnt Music, Universal Music Australia (October 2010)
One – Difrnt Music, Universal Music Australia (November 2010)
City Called Home – Difrnt Music, Universal Music Australia (December 2010)
Radio – Independent (November 2013)
Australian / Run This Shit – Britcore Rawmance (2016)
The Rhyme Slayers EP – Naked Ape Records / Underground United (July 2019)

Mix Tapes
Two Thousand And Nine – Free MP3 Download (2009)
2010 Mixtape – Free Facebook MP3 Download (2010)

Video Clips
Find Ya Higher (2004) from Blades of Hades
Blast Opposition (2007) from This Installment
Cannibalistic Act (2009) from Shadow Art
Where The Fire's At (2010)
The Rhyme Slayers (2019) from The Rhyme Slayers

Other Appearances
Underground United Vol. 1 (2009, Naked Ape Recordings, Underground United) – Contributed the track Kaos Orda from Blades of Hades.
Skip Hip: Volume One (2009, Rubber Records, EMI) – Contributed multiple tracks: Intro (DJ Scoob, Scotty B), Choirific (Scotty B), Mr. Mister (Tyrrell), Austyles (Blades Of Hades) and Hardcore (Blades Of Hades).
King HIts by Bouncer (2009) – "Can't Get Past Us" (Feat. Blades Of Hades)

References

External links
Blades Official Myspace

Australian hip hop groups
New South Wales musical groups
Australian industrial music groups
Alternative hip hop groups
Musical groups established in 2000
Obese Records artists